Maqsood Ahmed (born 30 August 1957) is a Pakistani former professional squash player.

Born in Karachi, he started playing squash in 1968 and turned professional in 1978. In 1977 he became the first player to win the Pakistani Amateur and Open titles in the same year. He retained a world top ten seeding for a decade.

References

External links
 

Pakistani male squash players
1957 births
Living people